Jürgen Roelandts (born 2 July 1985) is a Belgian former professional road bicycle racer, who rode professionally between 2008 and 2020, for the ,  and  squads. He now works as a directeur sportif for his final professional team, .

Career
In 2013, he achieved a very prestigious placing, finishing third in the Tour of Flanders. In June 2015, Roelandts came in second place at the Belgian National Road Race Championships, losing out after a two-man break with Preben Van Hecke.

Major results
Source: 

2001
 1st  Time trial, National Cadet Road Championships
2002
 National Junior Road Championships
1st  Road race
3rd Time trial
2003
 3rd Time trial, National Junior Road Championships
2004
 3rd Omloop van het Houtland
2005
 3rd Duo Normand (with Dominique Cornu)
 5th Grand Prix de la ville de Pérenchies
 8th Nationale Sluitingsprijs
2006
 1st Stage 2 Tour de Normandie
 1st Stage 2 Tour du Loir-et-Cher
 3rd Circuit de Wallonie
 4th Omloop van de Vlaamse Scheldeboorden
 6th Ronde Van Vlaanderen Beloften
 7th Overall Tour de Bretagne
1st Points classification
 8th Schaal Sels
2007
 1st Paris–Tours Espoirs
 2nd Overall Ronde van Vlaams-Brabant
1st Stage 3
 4th Kattekoers
 4th Omloop van de Vlaamse Scheldeboorden
 5th Overall Tour du Loir-et-Cher
 7th Overall Tour de Bretagne
1st Points classification
 10th Circuit de Wallonie
 10th Nationale Sluitingsprijs
2008
 1st  Road race, National Road Championships
 1st Stage 5 Tour de Pologne
 2nd Nokere Koerse
 3rd Overall Circuit Franco-Belge
1st Stage 3
 3rd Memorial Rik Van Steenbergen
 5th Overall Tour of Qatar
 6th Overall Volta ao Algarve
 6th Tour de Rijke
 7th Ronde van het Groene Hart
 8th Omloop van de Vlaamse Scheldeboorden
 9th Overall Eneco Tour
1st  Points classification
 10th Grote Prijs Jef Scherens
2009
 1st  Points classification Tour de Pologne
 3rd Tour de Rijke
 4th Dutch Food Valley Classic
 4th Grote Prijs Stad Zottegem
 5th Overall Four Days of Dunkirk
 8th Overall Tour of Belgium
1st  Sprints classification
2010
 3rd Memorial Rik Van Steenbergen
 6th Gent–Wevelgem
 8th Overall Tour Down Under
1st  Young rider classification
 9th Grand Prix de Wallonie
 10th Overall Eneco Tour
2011
 2nd E3 Prijs Vlaanderen
 4th Grand Prix Cycliste de Montréal
 5th Road race, UCI Road World Championships
 6th Vattenfall Cyclassics
 9th Omloop Het Nieuwsblad
2012
 1st  Overall Tour de l'Eurométropole
1st  Points classification
1st Stage 1
 1st Stage 4 Tour de Luxembourg
 3rd Overall Ster ZLM Toer
 5th GP Ouest–France
 7th Road race, Olympic Games
 7th Grand Prix Cycliste de Montréal
2013
 3rd Tour of Flanders
 4th GP Ouest–France
 7th Overall Tour Méditerranéen
1st  Points classification
1st Stage 5
 8th Overall Tour of Belgium
 8th Omloop Het Nieuwsblad
 9th Overall Ster ZLM Toer
2014
 3rd Overall Tour of Qatar
 10th Gent–Wevelgem
 10th GP Ouest–France
2015
 2nd Road race, National Road Championships
 3rd Overall Tour de l'Eurométropole
1st  Points classification
 5th GP Ouest–France
 7th E3 Harelbeke
 7th Gent–Wevelgem
 8th Tour of Flanders
2016
 3rd Milan–San Remo
 3rd Binche–Chimay–Binche
 7th Gent–Wevelgem
 10th Tour de l'Eurométropole
2017
 4th Scheldeprijs
 4th Vuelta a Murcia
2018
 1st Gullegem Koerse
 Volta a la Comunitat Valenciana
1st Stages 3 (TTT) & 5
 5th Milan–San Remo
2019
 8th Trofeo Andratx–Lloseta
2020
 7th Giro della Toscana
 10th Kuurne–Brussels–Kuurne

Grand Tour general classification results timeline

Classic results timeline

References

External links

Palmares at Cycling Base

Belgian male cyclists
1985 births
Living people
People from Asse
Cyclists at the 2012 Summer Olympics
Olympic cyclists of Belgium
Cyclists from Flemish Brabant